Sareptidae is a family of bivalves belonging to the order Nuculanida.

Genera:
 Aequiyoldia Soot-Ryen, 1951
 Pristigloma Dall, 1900
 Sarepta Adams, 1860
 Setigloma Schileyko, 1983

References

Nuculanida
Bivalve families